The Littleton T. Clarke House is a historic home located at Pocomoke City, Worcester County, Maryland, United States. It is a -story Second Empire–style frame house with a concave curved mansard roof constructed about 1860.

The Littleton T. Clarke House was listed on the National Register of Historic Places in 1996.

References

External links
, including undated photo, at Maryland Historical Trust

Houses on the National Register of Historic Places in Maryland
Houses in Worcester County, Maryland
Second Empire architecture in Maryland
Houses completed in 1860
National Register of Historic Places in Worcester County, Maryland